Chisom Egbuchulam (born 22 February 1992) is a Nigerian professional footballer who plays for Meizhou Hakka as a striker.

Club career
Egbuchulam moved on loan from Enugu Rangers to Swedish club BK Häcken in February 2017. He signed for Falkenberg in April 2018. In January 2019 he moved to South Korean club Suwon FC.

In January 2020 he signed for Meizhou Hakka. He would go on to be utilized as a vital member of the team that gained promotion to the top tier after coming second within the division at the end of the 2021 China League One campaign.

International career
In October 2016, Egbuchulam was called up to the Nigeria senior squad and was an unused substitute as the Super Eagles beat Zambia 2-1.

Career statistics
.

Honours

Club
Enugu Rangers
Nigeria Premier League: 2016

References

External links

1992 births
Living people
Nigerian footballers
Rangers International F.C. players
BK Häcken players
Falkenbergs FF players
Suwon FC players
Nigeria Professional Football League players
Allsvenskan players
Superettan players
K League 2 players
China League One players
Association football forwards
Nigerian expatriate footballers
Nigerian expatriate sportspeople in Sweden
Expatriate footballers in Sweden
Nigerian expatriate sportspeople in South Korea
Expatriate footballers in South Korea
Meizhou Hakka F.C. players
Nigerian expatriates in China
Expatriate footballers in China